Michael Fraser may refer to:
 Michael Fraser (footballer) (born 1983), Scottish football goalkeeper
 Michael Fraser (basketball) (born 1984), Canadian basketball player
 Michael Fraser, Baron Fraser of Kilmorack (1915–1996), British Conservative Party political administrator

See also 
 Mike Fraser (disambiguation)